Resovia is the basketball section of the Polish multi-sports club of the same name.

It was as CWKS Resovia the most successful Polish team of the 1970s. Since then it has undergone several transformations due to financial troubles; the last senior men's team played in the bottom, third tier of the league pyramid in 2009 under the name KKS Resovia Rzeszów. It currently runs only junior teams under the name Resovia Basket.

Their most famous player was Wojciech Myrda.

Honours
Polish Champions: 1975
Polish Runners-up: 1973, 1974, 1979
Polish Championship Bronze medal: 1976, 1977
Polish Cup Champions: 1974

References

External links 
 Official parent sports club website
 Official basketball club website

Resovia
Sport in Rzeszów
1910 establishments in Poland
Basketball teams in Poland